Boris Kozhin or Borys Kozhyn; 25 October 1944) is the former Commander of the Ukrainian Navy (April 1992 – October 1993). He became the first commander of the revived Ukrainian Navy.

Borys Kozhyn was born in Pskov in 1944 in a family of the World War II veteran who was repressed in 1947 and convicted for 25 years, but in 1956 rehabilitated. In 1959 Kozhyn family moved to Lutsk where lived relatives of Borys Kozhyn's mother. Borys' mother herself is from a small of Pidhaitsi (historical region of Halychyna).

Upon finishing school in 1961 Kozhyn worked as a mechanic at the Lutsk vehicle maintenance factory. In 1963 he became a champion of Volyn, a vice-champion of Ukraine in cycling and won a bronze medal of the Spartakiad of Peoples of the USSR in road bicycle racing, competition for which in the framework of the spartakiad was taking place in Ternopil.

In 1968 Kozhyn graduated the Frunze Higher Naval School in Leningrad with specialty "Antisubmarine armament" as an electrical engineer. Upon graduation (August 1968 - November 1971) he was placed as a commander assistant and commander of an anti-submarine boat PR-201 (predecessor of Poti-class corvette) (military unit 99724) that was part of the Black Sea Fleet division of ships carrying out security of water district (divizia korablei OVR) in Sevastopol. During that period he also served as a commander assistant of a patrol ship PR-159 (Petya-class frigate) (military unit 20935) in Donuzlav.

In 1971-72 Kozhyn completed the Naval Advanced Special Officers' Classes in Leningrad. In 1972-75 he was a commander of a patrol ship PR-159 in Donuzlav and after that was chief of staff for a brigade of minesweepers (military unit 34234), Black Sea Fleet Naval base in Donuzlav.

In 1978-80 Kozhyn attended and completed the Grechko Naval Academy in Leningrad. After that he was a commander of security brigade of water district (military unit 26977), Black Sea Fleet Naval base in Sevastopol. In 1986-92 he served as a chief of staff – deputy commander of the Black Sea Fleet Naval base (military unit 99324) in Donuzlav. During that period in 1987-88 Kozhyn was a member of the Crimean regional council.

In February – April 1992 Kozhyn was commander of the Black Sea Fleet Crimean Naval base (today Southern Naval base) in Donuzlav. On 1 December 1991, the Crimean Naval Base voted for the Ukrainian independence referendum with 93% of approval for independence.

Notes

References

External links
 Mamchak, M. Ukrainian Naval Commanders: Kozhyn Borys Borysovych, Commander of Ukrainian Navy, vice-admiral (ФЛОТОВОДЦІ УКРАЇНИ КОЖИН БОРИС БОРИСОВИЧ, командувач Військово-Морських Сил України, віце-адмірал). Ukrainian life in Sevastopol. 
 Biography at Flot 2017. 

1944 births
Ukrainian admirals
People from Pskov
Ukrainian people of Russian descent
Russian emigrants to Ukraine
Ukrainian male cyclists
Soviet male cyclists
Road racing cyclists
Second convocation members of the Verkhovna Rada
Third convocation members of the Verkhovna Rada
People's Movement of Ukraine politicians
Ukrainian People's Party politicians
Living people
N. G. Kuznetsov Naval Academy alumni